Fayez Bilal Chamsine (born 12 July 1992) is a Lebanese professional footballer who plays as a forward for  club Ansar.

Club career
Chamsine joined Pandurii Târgu Jiu in 2013, and scored a hat-trick on his first team debut, in a Romanian Cup match against Farul Constanța on 25 September 2013. He debuted in Liga I for Pandurii in a 2–1 loss against Gaz Metan Mediaș. He later signed for I-League side Chennai City in 2018, but did not appear in any league match.

After having his contract rescinded by Nejmeh on 19 February 2020, Chamsine joined Polish I liga side Bruk-Bet Termalica Nieciecza on 5 March 2020, on a six-month contract with an option for a further year. He returned to Lebanon on 23 July 2021, joining Ansar.

Career statistics

International
Scores and results list Lebanon's goal tally first, score column indicates score after each Chamsine goal.

Honours
FC St. Pauli II
 Oberliga Hamburg: 2011

Pandurii Târgu Jiu
 Cupa Ligii runners-up: 2014–15

Ansar
 Lebanese Super Cup: 2021
 Lebanese FA Cup runner-up: 2021–22

References

External links

 
 
 
 
 

1992 births
Living people
Sportspeople from Tripoli, Lebanon
Lebanese emigrants to Germany
Lebanese footballers
Association football forwards
Hamburger SV players
FC St. Pauli players
FC St. Pauli II players
Hannover 96 players
Hannover 96 II players
Al Egtmaaey SC players
CS Pandurii Târgu Jiu players
AC Tripoli players
Saham SC players
Chennai City FC players
Nejmeh SC players
Bruk-Bet Termalica Nieciecza players
Al Ansar FC players
Oberliga (football) players
Regionalliga players
Liga I players
Lebanese Premier League players
Oman Professional League players
I-League players
I liga players
Lebanon international footballers
Lebanese expatriate footballers
Lebanese expatriate sportspeople in Germany
Lebanese expatriate sportspeople in Romania
Lebanese expatriate sportspeople in Oman
Lebanese expatriate sportspeople in India
Lebanese expatriate sportspeople in Poland
Expatriate footballers in Germany
Expatriate footballers in Romania
Expatriate footballers in Oman
Expatriate footballers in India
Expatriate footballers in Poland